Nadine A. Turchin (November 26, 1826 – July 17, 1904) was the wife of Union Brigadier General John Basil Turchin. During the American Civil War, she traveled with her husband on his military campaigns and at times acted as his surrogate in command of his troops. She kept a detailed diary that remains a leading eyewitness account of her husband's colorful career. She became widely known in the Union army as "Madame Turchin."

Biography 
She was born as Nadezhda Antonovna L'vova (or Lovow) in Russia, the daughter of an officer in the Russian Army. On May 10, 1856, in Krakow, Poland, she married Ivan Vasilovitch Turchaninov, with whom she immigrated to the United States in 1856. Upon their arrival in the US and their eventual settlement on a farm in New York, they anglicized their names. They later moved to Philadelphia and then to Chicago, where he worked as a topographical engineer for the Illinois Central Railroad.

With the outbreak of the Civil War in early 1861, John Turchin was chosen to be Colonel of the 19th Illinois Infantry and later would be the only Russian-born general to serve in the Union Army. Nadine traveled with her husband throughout the war despite orders against wives traveling on campaigns.

During her husband's brief illness in 1862, it was alleged that Nadine  "took his place as regimental commander," but likely did not assume full command. Stories of her military savvy and heroism were reported by soldiers from Illinois and in later newspaper articles about her.

When Colonel Turchin was accused of dereliction of duties, she went to Chicago and then to Washington, D.C., to rally the public in his defense. A plea for help reached White House and Turchin was promoted to brigadier general. On August 8, 1862, Chicago Times wrote, "truly in the lottery matrimonial Col. Turchin had the good fortune to draft an invaluable prize."

In 1863, Nadine started a regular diary that included her opinions on her husband's fellow officers and commentary on battles that she participated in, including Chickamauga. During the battle, she stayed with the brigade and division wagons, which were parked just on the western edge of the battlefield, and she climbed up onto the eastern hills of Missionary Ridge to observe events during the Battle of Missionary Ridge. She left detailed accounts of both battles, in effect being the only Union female diarist of those battles.

After the war, the Turchins settled in Radom, Illinois. They had no children. After her husband's death in 1901, Nadine  applied for and received a pension of $30 a month as a military widow instead of as a nurse or soldier. Nadine Turchin died in 1904 and was buried next to her husband in Mound City National Cemetery in southern Illinois.

Recognition 
Nadine A. Turchin earned a place in America's collective memory. On April 25, 1961, Fred Schwengel, while speaking in the United States Congress about women in the American Civil War, said,

See also 

 History of women in the United States

References

Further reading
 Bergeron, Destiny. Women in Blue: The Story of Three Women from Illinois Who Fought in the Civil War. Thesis (B.A.), Lake Forest College, 2002, 2002. 
 Casstevens, Frances Harding. Tales from the North and the South: Twenty-Four Remarkable People and Events of the Civil War. Jefferson, N.C.: McFarland & Co, 2007.  
 East, Ernest E. Lincoln's Russian General, Journal of the Illinois State Historical Society, Vol. 52, No. 1, Lincoln Sesquicentennial (Spring, 1959), pp. 106–122 
 Hall, Richard H. Women on the Civil War Battlefront. Lawrence: University of Kansas Press, 2006. pp. 44, 260-261. 
 Harper, Judith E. Women During the Civil War: An Encyclopedia. New York: Routledge, 2004.  
 Kennedy, Deena. "Mrs. General": Nadine Turchin and the Nineteenth Illinois Infantry in the Civil War. Thesis (M.A.)--Illinois State University, 1992. 
Massey, Mary Elizabeth. Women in the Civil War. Lincoln: University of Nebraska Press, 1966. pp. 69–70. 
 Mcelligott, Mary Ellen.  A Monotony Full of Sadness": The Diary of Nadine Turchin, May, 1863-April, 1864, Journal of the Illinois State Historical Society, Vol. 70, No. 1 (Feb., 1977), pp. 27–89 
 Parry, Albert. More on General Turchin, Russian Review, Wiley, Vol. 14, No. 1 (Jan., 1955), pp. 19–23

External links 
 

Women in the American Civil War
American people of Russian descent
American diarists
1825 births
1904 deaths
People from Chicago
Women diarists
Writers from Chicago
19th-century women writers
19th-century diarists